Drop out ink is ink specifically colored to avoid reading in high-speed OCR scanners. It is often a pastel yellow, red or orange.

The purpose for dropping out specific colors is to allow the OCR scanner to ignore those colors and operate only on the foreground information.

Drop out ink is often used in the finance industry for automated paper invoice processing.

Drop out ink is not the same as inks that have been screened down.

References

Inks